Kristian Vasilev (born 18 November 1991) is a Bulgarian rower. He competed in the men's double sculls event at the 2016 Summer Olympics.

References

External links
 

1991 births
Living people
Bulgarian male rowers
Olympic rowers of Bulgaria
Rowers at the 2016 Summer Olympics
Place of birth missing (living people)